South Pacific is considered to be one of the greatest Broadway musicals. The musical premiered in 1949 and won the Pulitzer Prize for Drama in 1950.  The show was a critical and box office hit and has since enjoyed many successful revivals and tours, also spawning a 1958 film and other adaptations.

The original Broadway production won ten Tony Awards, including Best Musical, Best Score and Best Libretto, and it is the only musical production ever to have won all four Tony Awards for acting.  The 2008 Broadway revival was a strong success, winning numerous theatre awards.  Its seven Tonys included Best Musical Revival.  Sher and Szot also won Tonys, and the production won in all four design categories, also receiving nominations for choreography and for the performances of O'Hara, Burstein and Ables Sayre.  It also won five Drama Desk Awards, including Outstanding Musical Revival.  The late Robert Russell Bennett was recognized that season for "his historic contribution to American musical theatre in the field of orchestrations, as represented on Broadway this season by Rodgers and Hammerstein’s South Pacific."

Awards and nominations

Original Broadway production

2001 London revival

2001 Television film

2008 Broadway revival

2011 London revival

Notes

References
Nolan, Frederick. The Sound of Their Music: The Story of Rodgers & Hammerstein.  Applause Theatre & Cinema Books, New York, 2002.

External links 
 
South Pacific at the Rodgers and Hammerstein Organization

South Pacific (musical)
Tales of the South Pacific
Rodgers and Hammerstein